TV5 (TV Five) is a Finnish television channel owned and operated by Warner Bros. Discovery EMEA. The channel launched in March 2004 but it was replaced by The Voice TV Finland in November 2004. It started operating again in September 2008 on the same channel as The Voice. It transmitted every day from 6pm to 1am. In the fall of 2010, TV5 started using the same logo, identity, graphics, and branding as Kanal 5, a channel in Sweden also owned by SBS Discovery. TV5 and The Voice became separate channels on April 1, 2011. After that TV5 became the fastest growing channel, by viewers, in Finland in 2011.

Logo and identities

Programming
TV5 airs feature films, series and documentaries.

 3rd Rock from the Sun
 Absolutely Fabulous
 America's Funniest Home Videos
 Beach Patrol
 Beauty and the Geek Australia
 Benidorm Bastards
 Dark Justice
 Farscape
 Flashpoint
 Geordie Shore
 Grounded for Life
 Harry Enfield's Television Programme
 Home and Away
 Intervention
 Jon & Kate Plus 8
 Jersey Shore
 MacGyver
 Men Behaving Badly
 My Wife and Kids
 NCIS
 Numb3rs
 Operation Repo
 Packed to the Rafters
 Private Chefs of Beverly Hills
 Relic Hunter
 Rookie Blue
 Sexcetera
 That '70s Show
 The Blacklist
 The Catherine Tate Show
 The Fast Show
 The Friday Night Project

References

External links
 http://www.tv5.fi/

Television channels in Finland
Television channels and stations established in 2004
Warner Bros. Discovery networks
Warner Bros. Discovery EMEA